Hibbertia aurea is a shrub in the Dilleniaceae family that is native to Western Australia.

Description
It blooms between July and October and produces yellow flowers.

Taxonomy
The species was first formally described by the botanist Ernst Gottlieb von Steudel in 1845 as part of Johann Georg Christian Lehmann's work Dilleniaceae. Plantae Preissianae.
The specific epithet is taken from the Latin word meaning gold in reference to the colour of the flower.

Distribution
The species is found mostly along the west coast in the Mid West, Wheatbelt, Peel and South West regions of Western Australia from around Geraldton in the north down to around Nannup in the south. The plant grows in granitic or lateritic soils.

See also
List of Hibbertia species

References

aurea
Eudicots of Western Australia
Plants described in 1845